Shrinking is an American comedy-drama television series created by Bill Lawrence, Jason Segel and Brett Goldstein. It premiered on January 27, 2023, on Apple TV+. It was renewed for a second season in March 2023.

Premise
A therapist, Jimmy Laird, dealing with severe grief, begins to breach ethical barriers by telling his patients what he really thinks, resulting in massive changes to his and their lives.

Cast

Main
 Jason Segel as Jimmy Laird, a therapist grieving the death of his wife
 Jessica Williams as Gaby, a fellow therapist working with Jimmy at the Cognitive Behavioral Therapy Center
 Luke Tennie as Sean, a patient suffering from anger management issues who has sessions with Jimmy
 Michael Urie as Brian, Jimmy's best friend who is a lawyer
 Lukita Maxwell as Alice, Jimmy's teenage daughter with whom he shares a strained relationship
 Christa Miller as Liz, Jimmy's next-door neighbor who also helps with looking after Alice
 Harrison Ford as Dr. Paul Rhoades, a senior therapist and colleague of Jimmy's at the Cognitive Behavioral Therapy Center who has Parkinson's disease.

Recurring

 Ted McGinley as Derek, Liz's husband
 Heidi Gardner as Grace, one of Jimmy's patients
 Lilan Bowden as Tia, Jimmy's wife and Alice's mother who died in a car accident
 Kimberly Condict as Wally, one of Jimmy's patients who has obsessive–compulsive disorder
 Devin Kawaoka as Charlie, Brian's fiancé
 Rachel Stubington as Summer, Alice's best friend at school
 Lily Rabe as Meg, Paul's daughter

Guest
 Asif Ali as Alan, one of Jimmy's patients
 Tilky Jones as Donny, Grace's abusive boyfriend
 Miriam Flynn as Pam, Jimmy and Liz's heavily disliked neighbor
 Wendie Malick as Dr. Julie Baram, a neurologist treating Paul's Parkinson's disease
 Gavin Lewis as Connor, the son of neighbors Liz and Derek, and friend of Alice
 Neil Flynn as Raymond, one of Paul's patients

Episodes

Production
It was announced in October 2021 that Apple TV+ had ordered a ten-episode season for the series, which would star Jason Segel, who co-created alongside Brett Goldstein and Bill Lawrence. 

In April 2022, Harrison Ford, Jessica Williams, Christa Miller, Michael Urie, Luke Tennie, and Lukita Maxwell joined the cast, with James Ponsoldt joining the production as a director and executive producer. As revealed in a 2023 interview with James Hibberd of The Hollywood Reporter, Ford took up the offer to play Dr. Paul Rhoades despite mentioning years ago in 2002 that he works only once a year, citing the COVID-19 pandemic and his commitments to the titular role of the long-delayed Indiana Jones and the Dial of Destiny as one of the reasons he had done not much work as he wished and wanted to try on new things. Similarly to his role in 1923, Ford accepted the role despite there not being a script at the time, trusting that Segel, Goldstein, Lawrence and Brian Gallivan would deliver him a good script.

Production began in April 2022. The series was released on January 27, 2023, with the first two episodes premiering together and the rest releasing on a weekly basis. It has a total of ten episodes in the first season.

The series theme song "Frightening Fishes" was written by Ben Gibbard and Tom Howe.

In March 2023, Apple TV+ renewed the series for a second season.

Reception
The review aggregator website Rotten Tomatoes reported an 81% approval rating with an average rating of 7.3/10, based on 79 critic reviews. The website's critics consensus reads, "Shrinking has darker ideas on its mind than its earnest approach can often translate, but Jason Segel and Harrison Ford's sparkling turns make these characters worth close analysis." Metacritic, which uses a weighted average, assigned a score of 68 out of 100 based on 33 critics, indicating "generally favorable reviews".

Kristen Baldwin of Entertainment Weekly gave the series a B+ and described the series as "a funny, brainy grief-com about the power—and dangers—of radical honesty." Chicago Sun-Timess Richard Roeper gave a rating of 3.5 out of 4 stars and said, "You never know what goes on behind the scenes, but one gets the feeling Ford is having a great time on this show. We're sure having a great time watching it."  Writing for The Wall Street Journal, John Anderson stated, "The overall sense is a little like laughing at a funeral; the human impulses are familiar, a little perverse and somehow comforting."

References

External links

2020s American comedy-drama television series
2023 American television series debuts
Apple TV+ original programming
English-language television shows
Television series by Warner Bros. Television Studios
Television shows set in Pasadena, California